Rábano de Aliste is a municipality located in the province of Zamora, Castile and León, Spain. According to the 2004 census (INE), the municipality has a population of 450 inhabitants.

Town hall
Rábano de Aliste is home to the town hall of 4 villages:
Sejas de Aliste (123 inhabitants, INE 2020).
Tola (107 inhabitants, INE 2020).
Rábano de Aliste (78 inhabitants, INE 2020).
San Mamed (45 inhabitants, INE 2020).

References

Municipalities of the Province of Zamora